Super Eurobeat Presents Euro Every Little Thing is a remix album, consisting of recordings by Japanese pop group Every Little Thing remixed by various eurobeat producers from Italy, released in 2001 by Avex Trax.


Tracks

Further details
Euro Every Little Thing is an album in the Super Eurobeat Presents : J-Euro series launched in 2000, along with the likes of Ayu-ro Mix 1–2 featuring Ayumi Hamasaki, Hyper Euro MAX featuring MAX, Euro Global featuring globe, Euro "Dream" Land featuring Dream, J-Euro Best and J-Euro Non-Stop Best.

The album appeared on Oricon's album chart ten times, and reached #3.

References

Every Little Thing (band) albums
Euro Every Little Thing
2001 remix albums